Jodie Emery  (born January 4, 1985) is a Canadian cannabis rights activist and politician. She is the spouse of fellow activist Marc Emery. Until the business was shut down by police, the couple were co-owners of Cannabis Culture, a business that franchised pot dispensaries, later deemed to be illegal. They had obtained the cannabis from illegal sources, according to Crown prosecutors. They are the former operators and owners of Cannabis Culture magazine and Pot TV.

She has run a cannabis legalisation platform in the Green Party of British Columbia, and the British Columbia Marijuana Party, and in 2014 unsuccessfully filed a nomination for the federal Liberal Party in the riding of Vancouver East.

Early life
Emery was born and raised in Kamloops, BC, and graduated from St. Michael's University School in Victoria, British Columbia. She moved to Vancouver in 2004. She and Marc Emery married on July 23, 2006.

Activism
As the former editor of Cannabis Culture magazine, she has been active in cannabis legalisation movements worldwide since 2004.

She began her activism working for Marc Emery helping pack mail order cannabis as a teenager, and was later hired as assistant editor of Cannabis Culture magazine in early 2005. Emery has spoken regularly at "4/20", "Cannabis Day" and Global Marijuana March rallies in Vancouver and Toronto, as well as other events in Canada and the United States, including Moses Znaimer's Idea City conference in June 2012 and 2014, the New Hampshire Liberty Forum in February 2012, Canadian University Press conference in 2010, Canadian Investors Conference in 2014, Boston Freedom Rally in 2012 and 2013, and the Burgundy Luncheon Club in 2011.

Emery testified in favor of legalization at the Washington state legislature in 2011, and participated in marijuana legalization initiatives in California in November 2010 and Washington State in 2012. She was part of a national press conference hosted by Stop the Violence BC in April 2012 featuring former British Columbia attorney general Geoffrey Plant, Dr. Evan Wood, and the United States prosecutor of her husband, John McKay.

During her husband's five year incarceration beginning in 2010 in the United States, Emery was active seeking the repatriation of her husband back to Canada, including protests at Conservative Party constituency offices in 2010, including the Calgary office of Prime Minister Stephen Harper, and holding a press conference inside Parliament alongside three Members of Parliament in October 2013.

Emery produced a weekly video broadcast called The Jodie Emery Show from 2010 to 2014. In 2014, Emery appeared in the Trailer Park Boys film "Don't Legalize It". Other film appearances include the documentaries "Evergreen: the Road to Legalization", "Prince of Pot: The US vs Marc Emery", "A NORML Life", and "Legalize It".

Criminal charges
Jodie and Marc Emery were both arrested in Montreal, and subsequently released on December 16, 2016 after opening several new Cannabis Culture dispensaries in that city. At one time, there were 19 Cannabis Culture dispensaries in operation, in British Columbia, Ontario and Quebec.

On March 8, 2017, the couple was arrested at Pearson International Airport and the Cannabis Culture shops were raided, leading to charges on a number of offences. The charges against 17 employees were withdrawn, but Jodie Emery was convicted of possession of marijuana for the purpose of trafficking and possession of proceeds of crime over $5,000.

Marc Emery was convicted of possession of marijuana for purpose of trafficking, trafficking marijuana and possession of proceeds of crime more than $5,000. They were required to pay fines ($150,000 and a $45,000 victim surcharge) and placed on two year probation.
After a guilty plea, the couple was convicted of drug related charges on December 18, 2017, fined and placed on two years probation. Three other individuals were also convicted of drug-related charges. The couple had claimed that the operation of pot shops was a form of civil disobedience, but Justice Leslie Chapin ruled as follows: "No doubt there were pro social motivations that were behind the actions, but at the same time, I have to recognize that much profit was made".

In the media
Since 2004, Emery has been featured in the mainstream media. She has had many letters to the editor published in newspapers across Canada, and has written for the National Post, Huffington Post, and The Guardian UK. Her activism has led to hundreds of interviews on local, provincial and national television and radio.

Emery has been interviewed and profiled in newspapers and magazines in the United States and Canada, including Maclean's magazine, Fresh Magazine, Elle Canada magazine, the Globe and Mail, National Post, and the Georgia Straight.

From 2013 to 2014, Emery was a regular participant on the Global TV's BC1 channel show "Unfiltered" with Jill Krop, providing opinions on a wide range of current events and news stories.

Political career
Emery regularly comments on issues beyond legalization, usually through her Twitter account. She advocates for non-violence, tax spending reform, electoral reform, environmental awareness, policing and prison reform, and affordable education.
She ran for provincial office as a B.C. Marijuana Party candidate in 2005, and again in a 2008 by-election.

She ran as a candidate for the BC Green Party in the May 2009 election, coming in third, losing to Liberal Party member Kash Heed. During the campaign, she was the BC Green Party's Policing and Crime Critic, and was elected as a Director-At-Large at the 2010 BC Green Party Annual General Meeting. She ran again in the 2013 general election for the BC Green Party in Vancouver-West End, finishing with 11.39% of the vote.

Emery unsuccessfully  filed her intention to seek the nomination for the Liberal Party in the riding of Vancouver East, held in Parliament by NDP MP Libby Davies, who announced she would not run in the 2015 federal election.

Electoral record

Personal life 
Emery and her husband have been separated for over a year as of January 2019.

References

External links
 Official site
 Cannabis Culture

Canadian women in business
Living people
1985 births
Marijuana Party (Canada) politicians
British Columbia Marijuana Party politicians
People from Kamloops
Liberal Party of Canada leadership candidates
Canadian cannabis activists